The 1976 Coppa Italia Final was the final of the 1975–76 Coppa Italia. The match was played on 29 June 1976 between Napoli and Hellas Verona. Napoli won 4–0.

Match

References 
Coppa Italia 1975/76 statistics at rsssf.com
 https://www.calcio.com/calendario/ita-coppa-italia-1975-1976-finale/2/
 https://www.worldfootball.net/schedule/ita-coppa-italia-1975-1976-finale/2/

Coppa Italia Finals
Coppa Italia Final 1976
Hellas Verona F.C. matches